Slavín is a memorial monument and military cemetery in Bratislava, the capital of Slovakia. It is the burial ground of thousands of Soviet Army soldiers who fell during World War II while taking over the city in April 1945 from the occupying German Wehrmacht units and the remaining Slovak troops who supported the clero-fascist Tiso government. It is situated on a hill amidst a rich villa quarter of the capital and embassy residences close to the centre of Bratislava.

It was constructed between 1957 and 1960 on the site of a field cemetery, and opened on April 3, 1960 on the occasion of the 15th anniversary of the city's liberation. The monument was constructed similar in kind to the Palace of Culture and Science in Stalinist architectural style. In 1961 it was declared a National Cultural Monument. Its designer was Ján Svetlík.

History 
The monument was inaugurated in 1960 on the occasion of the 15th anniversary of the liberation of the city by the Soviet army. Cities with dates of their liberation are listed on its walls. 6,845 soldiers are buried in the cemetery.

Description 
This monument and cemetery of the soldiers of the Soviet Army killed while liberating Bratislava near the end of the Second World War was designated a National Cultural Monument in 1961. On top of the 42 metre tall obelisk is a 12.5 metre tall statue of a soldier from Slovak sculptor Alexander Trizuljak. The soldier is holding up a flag in his right hand and crushing the swastika with his left boot. The bronze caisson door of the memorial auditorium is decorated with reliefs by R. Pribiš.

The site consists of:

A solemn staircase
A cemetery with graves (6 mass graves, 278 individual graves) of 6,845 Soviet soldiers who fell while liberating Bratislava
The central solemn hall with various statues, inscriptions, and a symbolic sarcophagus made of white marble. It also features a 42 m high obelisk topped with a statue of a Soviet soldier, and on the outside walls are inscriptions of the dates of liberation of various places in Slovakia during 1944–45.

Other facts about Slavín:

The monument is situated on top of the Slavín hill, one of Bratislava Old Town's topographic highs (part of the Male Karpaty mts.). The location offers excellent views of much of Bratislava, which makes it a popular destination for walks for local residents.
In the area of Slavín there are also more statues of Slovak famous artists, such as Jan Kulich, Tibor Bártfay and Jozef Kostka.
In 2005, Vladimir Putin, the Russian president, visited it during his meeting with G. W. Bush in Bratislava.
The day of Bratislava's liberation is 4 April, when people and president show their honor to fallen Soviet soldiers.
In 2015, Sergey Lavrov, the Russian foreign minister, visited Slavín on the occasion of the 70th anniversary of Bratislava's liberation.

See also 
 Devín Carpathians

Buildings and structures completed in 1960
1960 establishments in Czechoslovakia
Buildings and structures in Bratislava
Monuments and memorials in Slovakia
Socialist realism
Stalinist architecture
Cemeteries in Slovakia
Soviet military memorials and cemeteries
Czechoslovakia–Soviet Union relations
Tourist attractions in Bratislava